Carolyn McLeod  (born 1969) is a Canadian bioethicist and feminist philosopher. She is a professor and Chair of the Department of Philosophy at the University of Western Ontario. In 2021, she was elected a Fellow of the Royal Society of Canada.

Early life and education
McLeod was born in 1969. She completed her Bachelor of Arts degree and Master's degree at Queen's University at Kingston before enrolling at Dalhousie University for her PhD. While completing her doctorate, McLeod worked under feminist philosopher Susan Sherwin. Her thesis was titled Self-trust and reproductive autonomy.

Career
Following her PhD, McLeod joined the Department of Philosophy at the University of Western Ontario (UWO). In this role, she received the 2009 University Students’ Council Award of Excellence in Undergraduate Teaching. McLeod was later named the 2011 Graham and Gale Wright Distinguished Scholar. She was shortly thereafter promoted to Chair of the Department of Philosophy and began applying for a Canada Research Chair.

In 2020, McLeod published Conscience in reproductive health care: prioritizing patient interests through the Oxford University Press. The following year, McLeod was elected a Fellow of the Royal Society of Canada for her "research on ethical issues in reproductive health care, and her work on the ethics of parenthood and adoption, and key concepts in moral philosophy such as trust and autonomy."

Personal life
McLeod is married to fellow philosopher Andrew Botterell.

Selected publications
Conscience in reproductive health care: prioritizing patient interests (2020)

References

External links

Living people
Canadian women philosophers
Canadian ethicists
Academic staff of the University of Western Ontario
Queen's University at Kingston alumni
Dalhousie University alumni
Fellows of the Royal Society of Canada
1969 births